Agriculture in Greece is based on small, family-owned dispersed units, while the extent of cooperative organization stays at low comparative levels, against all efforts that have been taken in the last 30 years, mainly under European Union supervision.
Greek agriculture employs 528,000 farmers, 12% of the total labor force. It produces more than 14% of the national GDP.
 
Greece produces a wide variety of crops and livestock products. Fisheries are also playing an important role while forestry plays a secondary role.

Current production
Currently, Greek agriculture is heavily subsidized by the Common Agricultural Policy (CAP), with controversial results. Certain deductions of subsidies are planned within the next decade.

Greece produced in 2018:

 1.2 million tons of maize;
 1 million tons of olive (5th largest producer in the world, behind Spain, Italy, Morocco and Turkey);
 1 million tons of wheat;
 968 thousand tons of peach (3rd largest producer in the world, behind China and Italy);
 933 thousand tons of grape (19th largest producer in the world);
 913 thousand tons of orange (17th largest producer in the world);
 837 thousand tons of cotton;
 835 thousand tons of tomatoes;
 630 thousand tons of watermelon;
 465 thousand tons of potato;
 353 thousand tons of sugar beet;
 344 thousand tons of barley;
 285 thousand tons of apple;
 265 thousand tons of kiwi (5th largest producer in the world, behind China, Italy, New Zealand and Iran);

In addition to smaller productions of other agricultural products.

Modern history

19th century

In the 19th century, Greek agriculture was very basic. Implements found in western Europe had not yet appeared. The following description was reported by William Henry Moffett, American Consul in Athens and was published in the American periodical Garden and Forest (Volume 2, Issue 95, 18 December 1889, p. 612: published by Garden and Forest Publishing Co., Tribune Building, New York, N.Y.):

William H. Moffett, United States Consul at Athens, reports the impossibility of making any official statement as to the agriculture of Greece, because "agriculture is here in the most undeveloped condition. Even in the immediate neighborhood of Athens it is common to find the wooden plow and the rude mattock which were in use 2,000 years ago. Fields are plowed up or scratched over, and crops replanted season after season, until the exhausted soil will bear no more. Fertilizers are not used to any appreciable extent, and the farm implements are of the very rudest description. Irrigation is in use in some districts, and, as far as I can ascertain, the methods in use can be readily learned by a study of the practices of the ancient Egyptians. Greece has olives and grapes in abundance, and of quality not excelled; but Greek olive oil and Greek wine will not bear transportation."

20th century
Greek agricultural production was vastly expanded in the 20th century, as per the information given elsewhere on this page. In particular grain production (wheat, barley, etc.) has been significantly increased using more modern farming methods. Much of the research on soil classification, fertiliser use, and dissemination of improved agricultural practice was carried out starting from 1938 in the Kanellopoulos Institute of Chemistry and Agriculture.

There were over 8,000 farms all over Greece in 1998, with 9,730 hectares of land used for the growing of organic farming.

The main varieties of domestic wheat produced in Greece during 2002 were FLAVIO, VAVAROS and MEXA.

Notable products

Notable products include:
 Avgotaracho of Messolonghi
 Zante currant
 Greek wine
 Fava Santorinis
 Firiki Piliou
 Santorini tomato
 Krokos Kozanis (saffron)
 Menalou honey
 Florina pepper
 Rodi Ermionis
 Mastic (plant resin) of Chios
 Tobacco production (region of Macedonia)
 Tropical fruits (such as bananas and avocados) in Crete
 Carob

Olive cultivars/varieties
Note: The below list is not considered exhaustive.

Gallery

See also
Greek cuisine
Economy of Greece
Greek wild olive varieties

References